The Mercedes-Benz OM642 engine is a , 24-valve, aluminium/aluminium block and heads diesel 72° V6 engine manufactured by the Mercedes-Benz division of Daimler AG as a replacement for the Mercedes straight-5 and straight-6 cylinder engines.

The engine features common rail Direct injection and a variable nozzle turbocharger. The engine features a counter-rotating balance shaft mounted between the cylinder banks to cancel the vibrations inherent to the 72 degree V6 design, and the crankpins are offset by 48 degrees to achieve even 120 degree firing intervals. In some heavy vehicle applications, Mercedes' BlueTec AdBlue urea injection is utilised for NOx reduction. In lighter vehicle applications, a NOx storage catalyst captures nitrous oxides, which are periodically purged (decomposed) by running the engine slightly rich. A particulate filter lowers soot, making this engine ULEV certified.

At the beginning of summer 2017 the engine, together with Mercedes-Benz OM651 was under investigation by the Federal Motor Transport Authority in respect of the alleged emissions cheating scandal wherein the laboratory emissions testing produced a different amount of diesel exhaust fluid usage and lower emissions than in real world operating scenarios.

Implementation

Vehicles using this engine include:
 Dodge / Freightliner Trucks / Mercedes-Benz Sprinter (2006–Present)
 Jeep Grand Cherokee WK/WH (2005-2010 (Europe)1, 2007-2008 (North America)2)
 Jeep Commander XK/XH (2006-2010 (Europe))
 Mercedes-Benz C320 CDI (2005–2007)
 Mercedes-Benz E280/E300/E320 CDI/BlueTEC (2007–2009)
 Mercedes-Benz C320/C350 CDI (2009–2014)
 Mercedes-Benz CLK320 CDI (2005–2010)
 Mercedes-Benz E350 CDI/BlueTEC (2010–2016)
 Mercedes-Benz E 350d (2016–2018)
 Mercedes-Benz GLK 350 CDI (2013–2015)
 Mercedes-Benz R280/R300/R320/R350 CDI/BlueTEC (2007–2012)
 Mercedes-Benz ML280/ML300/ML320/ML350 CDI/BlueTEC (2007–2011)
 Mercedes-Benz ML350 BlueTEC/GLE 350d (2011–2018)
 Mercedes-Benz G280 CDI Worker/G280 CDI Edition 30 PUR/G280/G300 CDI Professional (2007–2013)
 Mercedes-Benz G320 CDI/G350 CDI/BlueTEC (2007–2018)
 Mercedes-Benz GL320/350 CDI/BlueTEC (2006–2012)
 Mercedes-Benz GL350 BlueTEC/GLS 350d (2012–2018)
 Mercedes-Benz GLC 350d (2016–2019)
 Mercedes-Benz S320/350 CDI/BlueTEC (2005–2013)
 Mercedes-Benz S350 BlueTEC/S 350d (2013–2017)
 Mercedes-Benz CLS320/350 CDI (2005–2011)
 Mercedes-Benz Vito 120/122 CDI/Viano 3.0 CDI (2006–2014)
 Chrysler 300C (2006–2011) (Europe, Australia and New Zealand only)

1 EMEA market
2 NAFTA market

Intake System 
Air is drawn into the engine through two air filters located above each cylinder head. The amount of the air is measured by two hot film mass air flow sensors B2/6&7. On Sprinter models, a single air filter housing is mounted upon brackets on top of the engine.

The variable geometry Turbine is actuated via a linkage connecting the controller to vanes inside the Turbine housing. In the full-boost position, air is allowed to pass over the Turbine impeller. In the no boost position the vanes block exhaust gasses from acting on the impeller and route them down the exhaust pipe.

See also
 List of Mercedes-Benz engines
 List of engines used in Chrysler products

References

OM642
Diesel engines by model
V6 engines